Artūrs Priednieks Cavara (or 'Kavara) (born Artūrs Vilhelms Priednieks; June 29, 1901 – April 9, 1979) was a Latvian operatic tenor during the late 1920s through the early 1940s. Cavara had performing contracts with the State Opera Houses of Vienna, Berlin, the National Opera Riga, the City Opera Houses in Zurich, Liepaj, Barmen-Elberfel, and the Buenos Aires Teatro Colón in Argentina.
He began his vocal training at the Conservatory in Liepāja, and changed his last name to "Cavara" as a stage name in honor of his favorite role, Cavaradossi. (He was occasionally billed under the alternate spellings Kavara, or Kavarra.) Cavara's success and stardom peaked in the 1930s, but due to World War II and Joseph Stalin’s invasion of Latvia in the early 1940s, his singing and recording career was cut short prematurely; subsequently, many of his recordings have been lost or lie in obscurity. In 1947, he and his family emigrated to the United States via Ellis Island, settling in St. Peter, Minnesota, where he taught vocal instruction and opera production at Gustavus Adolphus College. He died on April 9, 1979, in Florida. His ashes are interred at the Latvian Memorial Park in the Catskills, Elka Park, NY.

Selected filmography
 The White Devil (1930)
 The Immortal Vagabond (1930)

References

External links
 
 
 

1901 births
1979 deaths
20th-century Latvian male opera singers
People from St. Peter, Minnesota